The following is a list of unincorporated and informal communities in the province of Ontario, Canada. These communities are not independent communities, these are usually a part of a township for the district, within a county. In non-urban areas, these are postal addresses.

Note: this list is not necessarily organized by municipality. For organized municipalities see list of municipalities in Ontario and for census subdivisions see list of census subdivisions in Ontario.

#
10th Line Shore

A

Aberdeen, Grey County
Aberdeen, Prescott and Russell County
Aberfeldy
Aberfoyle
Abingdon
Abitibi 70
Abitibi Canyon
Aboyne
Acanthus
Achill
Achray
Actinolite
Acton
Actons Corners
Adamsdale
Adamsville
Adanac, Nipissing District
Adanac, Parry Sound District
Addington
Addison
Adelaide-Metcalfe
Adelard
Adolphustown
Advance
Agawa Bay
Agerton
Ahmic Harbour
Ahmic Lake
Aikensville
Ailsa Craig
Airlie
Alban
Albert
Albion
Albuna
Albury
Alcona
Alder
Alderdale
Aldershot
Alderslea
Alderville
Aldreds Beach
Alexandria
Alfred
Algoma Mills
Algonquin
Alice
Allan Mills
Allan Park
Allanburg
Allandale
Allans Corners
Allen
Allenford
Allens Corner
Allensville
Allanwater Bridge
Allenwood
Allenwood Beach
Allimil
Allisonville
Alliston
Alloa
Alma
Almira
Almonte
Alport
Alsace
Alsfeldt
Althorpe
Alton
Altona
Alvanley
Alvinston
Amaranth Station
Amberley
Ameliasburgh
Ameliasburgh Township
Amesdale
Amherstburg
Amherst Pointe
Amherstview
Amigo Beach
Amulree
Amyot
Ancaster
Anderson
Andrewsville
Angus
Angus Glen
Annable
Ansnorveldt
Ansonville
Anten Mills
Antrim
Appin
Appleby Corner
Apple Hill
Apsley
Ardbeg
Arden
Ardendale
Ardoch
Ardtrea
Ariss
Arklan
Arkona
Arkwright
Armadale
Armstrong, Thunder Bay District
Armstrong Corners
Armstrong Mills
Aroland First Nation
Arranvale
Arthur
Arva
Ashburn
Ashby Mills
Ashgrove
Ashton
Ashworth
Aspdin
Asselstine
Assumption
Astorville
Atherley
Atherton
Athol, Prince Edward County
Athol, Stormont, Dundas and Glengarry United Counties
Atironto
Attawapiskat
Atwood
Auden
Aughrim
Austin
Avening
Avonmore
Aylen
Aylen Lake
Aylen Lake Station
Ayr
Ayton
Azilda

B

Babys Point
Baddow
Baden
Badenoch
Badger's Corners
Badjeros
Bagnall
Baie Du Dore
Bailey Corners
Bailieboro
Bainsville
Bairds
Bala
Balderson
Ballantrae
Ballinafad
Ballycanoe
Ballycroy
Ballyduff
Ballymote
Balmertown
Balmy Beach
Balsam Creek
Balsam Hill
Baltimore
Bamberg
Banda
Banner
Bannockburn
Baptiste
Barb
Bardsville
Barhead
Barlochan
Barriefield
Bar River
Barry's Bay
Barrymere
Barwick
Basingstoke
Bass Creek
Batawa
Batchawana Bay
Bath
Bathurst
Batteaux
Battersea
Baxter
Bayfield
Bayfield Inlet
Bayham
Bayside
Baysville
Bayview Park
Beachburg
Beachville
Bealton
Beamsville
Beardmore
Bearskin Lake
Beatrice
Beaumaris
Beaverdale
Beaver Lake
Beaver Meadow
Beaverton
Beeton
Bélanger
Belangers Corners
Belgrave
Belfountain
Bell Ewart
Bellamys
Bellamys Mill
Bell Rapids
Belle-Eau-Claire Beach
Belle River
Bell's Corners
Bells Crossing
Belmont
Belmore
Belton
Belwood
Benallen
Benmiller
Bennington
Bent River
Bentinck
Bentpath
Bergland
Berkeley
Berriedale
Berryton
Berwick
Bethany
Bethel, Elizabethtown-Kitley
Bethel, Kawartha Lakes
Bethel, Port Colborne
Bethel, Prince Edward
Beveridge Locks
Beverly Hills
Bewdley
Bickford
Biddulph
Bidwell
Big Bay
Big Cedar
Big Chute
Big Lake
Big Trout Lake
Bigwood
Bill's Corners
Birdell
Birdsalls
Birds Creek
Birge Mills
Birkendale
Birr
Biscotasing
Bishopsgate
Bishop Corners
Bismarck
Bisseltown
Bisset Creek
Blackburn Hamlet
Black Hawk
Blacks Corners, Dufferin County
Blacks Corners, Lanark County
Black Rapids
Blackstock
Blackstone Lake
Blackwater
Blairton
Blanchard's Landing
Blayney
Blenheim
Blezard Valley
Bloomfield
Bloomington
Bloomsburg
Blossom Park
Blount, Cochrane District, Ontario
Blount, Dufferin County, Ontario
Blue
Blue Church
Blue Corners
The Blue Mountains
Blue Springs, Halton Region
Blue Springs, Wellington County
Blue Water Beach
Blyth
Blytheswood
Bobcaygeon
Bogarttown
Boland's Bay
Bolton
Bona Vista
Bonarlaw
Bond Head
Boninville
Bonville
Booth's Harbour
Boothville
Borden
Bordenwood
Boston
Bothwell
Bourget
Bowling Green, Dufferin County
Bowling Green, Chatham-Kent
Bowmanville
Bowser's Corner
Box Grove
Boyds
Boyne
Brackenrig
Bradford
Bradshaw, Frontenac County, Ontario
Bradshaw, Lambton County, Ontario
Braemar
Braeside
Bray Lake
Brechin
Brent
Brentwood
Bridgenorth
Brier Hill
Brights Grove
Brightside
Britainville
Britannia
Britt
Broadbent
Brockview
Bromley
Brooklin
Brooksdale
Brooks Landing
Brougham
Brown's Corners
Brownsville, Durham Regional Municipality, Ontario
Brownsville, Oxford County, Ontario
Brucedale
Bruce Station
Brussels
Bryanston
Buckhorn
Bulgers Corners
Bullock
Bummer's Roost
Bunessan
Bunker Hill
Burford
Burgessville
Burgoyne
Burk's Falls
Burnbrae
Burnley
Burnstown
Burnt River
Burpee
Burton
Burwash
Bury's Green
Butternut Bay
Buttonville
Byng Inlet

C

Cache Bay
Cachet
Caderette
Cadmus
Caesarea
Cahore
Cainsville
Caintown
Cairngorm
Cairo
Caistor Centre
Caistorville
Calabogie
Caledon East
Caledonia
Caledonia Springs
California, Lanark County
California, Leeds and Grenville United Counties
Caliper Lake
Callum
Calm Lake
Calstock
Calton
Camborne
Cambray
Cambridge, Prescott and Russell United Counties
Camden
Camden East
Camilla
Camlachie
Campania
Campden
Campbellcroft
Campbellford
Campbelltown
Campbellville
Camp Oconto
Canal
Canborough
Canfield
Cannington
Capreol
Caramat
Cardiff
Cardinal
Cardwell
Cargill
Carholme
Carleton Place
Carlingford
Carlington
Carlisle
Carlow
Carlsbad Springs
Carlsruhe
Carmel, Northumberland County
Carmel, Peterborough County
Carp
Carrying Place
Carss
Cartier
Carthage
Cashtown Corners
Casimir
Cassburn
Castlederg
Castleford
Castlemore
Castleton
Cat Lake
Cataraqui
Cathcart
Caverlys Landing
Cayuga
Cavan-Monaghan
Cecebe
Cedarbrae
Cedar Beach
Cedar Croft
Cedardale
Cedar Grove
Cedar Meadows
Cedar Mills
Cedar Valley, Peterborough County
Cedar Valley, Wellington County
Cedar Village
Cedarville, Grey County
Cedarville, Simcoe County
Central Patricia
Centralia
Centre Dummer
Centrefield
Centre Inn
Centre Wellington
Centreton
Centreview
Centreville, Bruce County
Centreville, Grey County
Centreville, Lennox and Addington County
Centreville, Oxford County
Centreville, Waterloo Regional Municipality
Centurion
Ceylon
Chaffey's Lock
Chalk River
Charlieville
Charlottenburgh
Chartrand Corner
Chase Corners
Cheddar
Cheeseborough
Chelmsford
Cheltenham
Cheney
Chepstow
Cherry Valley
Chesley
Chesterville
Chetwynd
Chevrier
Chikopi
Chippewa Hill
Chippewas of Rama First Nation
Christian Valley
Churchill
Churchville
Chute-à-Blondeau
Clappison's Corners
Clare
Claremont
Clarence
Clarence Creek
Clarendon Station
Clareview
Clarina
Clarke
Clarkeburg
Clarkson
Clavering
Clayton
Clear Creek
Clear Lake
Clifford
Clinton
Clontarf
Clover Valley
Cloyne
Clyde
Clyde Forks
Clydesville
Cobden
Coboconk
Coe Hill
Coin Gratton
Colbeck
Colborne
Colchester
Cold Springs
Coldstream
Coldwater
Colebrook
Cole Lake
Coleraine
Colgan
Collins Bay
Colpoy's Bay
Columbus
Comber
Combermere
Commanda
Concord
Coniston
Conn
Connaught, Renfrew County
Connaught, Stormont, Dundas and Glengarry United Counties
Connaught, Timmins
Connellys
Conover
Constance Bay
Conway
Cooks Mills, Niagara Region
Cooks Mills, Nipissing District
Cook's Shore
Cookstown
Cooksville
Copper
Cooper's Falls
Copetown
Coppell
Copper Cliff
Copperhead
Copperkettle
Coppins Corners
Coral Rapids
Corbeil
Corbett
Corbetton
Corbyville
Cordova
Corkery
Cornell
Corunna
Cotieville
Cotnam Island
Cottesloe
Courtice
Courtland
Courtright
Craigleith
Craigmont
Craig Shore
Cramahe
Crathie
Crawford
Crean Hill
Crediton
Creemore
Creightons Corners
Creighton Mine
Cromarty
Crombie
Crooked Bay
Crookston
Crooked Creek
Crosby
Crosshill
Crowes Landing
Crow Lake
Croydon
Cruikshank
Crysler
Crystal Beach
Crystal Falls
Cumberland Beach
Cumberland, Ottawa
Cumberland, Simcoe County
Curran
Curry Hill

D

Dacre
Dain City
Dale
Dalhousie Lake
Dalhousie Mills
Dalkeith
Dalmeny
Dalrymple
Dalston
Dalton
Damascus
Dane
Darlingside
Dartford
Dashwood
Davis Mills
Dawn-Euphemia
Dawn Valley
Dee Bank
Deer Lake
Dejong
Delamere
Delaware
Delhi
Delta
Deloro
Denbigh
Den-Lou
Depot Harbour
Dereham Centre
Derland
Derryville
Desbarats
Desboro
Deseronto
Deux Rivières
Dexter
Dickson Hill
Dillon
Dinner Point Depot
Dinorwic
Dixie
Dixon's Corners
Dobbinton
Doe Lake
Dokis
Dominionville
Domville
Dongola
Don Mills
Donwood
Doon
Dorchester
Dorking
Dornoch
Dorset
Douglas
Douro
Douro-Dummer
Dowling
Downeyville
Dracon
Drayton
Dresden
Driftwood
Dormore
Drummond Centre
Drummond/North Elmsley
Dryden's Corner
Dublin
Duclos Point
Duck Lake
Dudley
Dufferin Bridge
Duffy
Dulcemaine
Dunblanc
Dunchurch
Dundalk
Dundas
Dundonald
Dunedin
Dugannon
Dunkeld
Dunnet's Corner
Dunnette Landing
Dunns Valley
Dunnville
Dunsford
Duntroon
Durham
Duthill
Dutton
Dutton/Dunwich
Dunvegan
Dwight
Dyer
Dymond
Dysart et al.

E

Eabametoong First Nation
Eades
Eads Bush
Eady
Eagle
Eagle Lake, Haliburton County
Eagle Lake, Parry Sound District
Eagle River
Eagles Nest
Ear Falls
Earlton
Earnscliffe
East Colborne
East Emily
East Hungerford
East Linton
East Luther-Grand Valley
East Oakland
East Oro
East Oxford
East Tay Point
Eastons Corners
Eastview
Eastwood
Eatonville
Eau Claire
Eau Claire Station
Ebbs Shore
Ebenezer, Hastings County,
Ebenezer, Leeds and Grenville United Counties
Ebenezer, Peel Regional Municipality
Ebenezer, Simcoe County
Eberts
Ebordale
Echo
Echo Bay
Eden
Eden Grove, Leeds and Grenville United Counties
Eden Grove, Bruce County
Eden Mills
Edenhurst
Edenvale
Edgar
Edgars
Edge Hill
Edgeley
Edgewater Beach
Edgewater Park
Edmore Beach
Edville
Edwards
Edys Mills
Effingham
Egan Creek
Eganville
Egbert
Egerton
Egmondville
Elba
Eldorado
Elizabeth Bay
Elizabethtown
Elizabethville
Elk Lake
Ellengowan
Ellisville
Elmgrove
Elmira
Elm Pine Trail
Elm Tree
Elmvale
Elmwood, Frontenac County
Elmwood, Grey County
Eloida
Elora
Elphin
Elsinore
Elzevir
Embro
Embrun
Emerald
Emery
Emsdale
Englehart
English Line
English River
Ennismore Township
Ennotville
Enterprise
Eramosa
Erin Mills
Erindale
Erinsville
Ernestown
Escott
Essonville
Estaire
Etwell
Eugenia
Evansville, Manitoulin District, Ontario
Evansville, Nipissing District, Ontario
Eversley
Everton
Exeter

F

Fair Valley
Fairfax
Fairfield
Fairfield East
Fairfield Plain
Fairground
Fairholme
Fairmount, Frontenac County
Fairmount, Grey County
Fairplay
Fairview, Renfrew County
Fairview, Elgin County
Fairview, Oxford County
Fairview, Renfrew County
Falconbridge, Middlesex County
Falconbridge, Greater Sudbury
Falding
Falkenburg Station
Falkland
Fallbrook
Fallowfield
Fanshawe
Fanshawe Lake
Farewell
Farleys Corners
Farmington
Farnham
Farquhar
Farrell Corners
Fassifern
Fawcettville
Fawkham
Featherstone Point
Feir Mill
Feldspar
Felton
Fenaghvale
Fenella
Fenelon Falls
Fenwick
Fergus
Ferguslea
Ferguson Corners
Ferguson Falls
Fergusons Beach
Fermoy
Fesserton
Feversham
Field
Fife's Bay
Finch
Fingal
Fishers Glen
Fisherville
Fitzroy Harbour
Five Corners
Five Mile Bay
Flamborough
Flanders
Flesherton
Flinton
Flinton Corners
Floradale
Florence
Flower Station
Foleyet
Folger
Fonthill
Fordwich
Forest
Forest Lea
Forget
Fort Albany
Forthton
Fort Irwin
Fort Severn
Fowlers Corners
Fox Corners
Foxboro
Foxey
Foymount
Frankford
Franktown
Frankville
Franz
Fraserdale
Fraserville
Fraxa
Freeman Corners
Fremo Corners
French Line
Froatburn
Frogmore
Fullarton
Fuller
Fulton

G

Gads Hill
Gagnon
Galbraith
Galesburg
Galetta
Gallimere Beach
Galingertown
Galts Corner
Gambridge
Gamebridge Beach
Gameland
Gananoque Junction
Gannon Village
Garden River
Gardiner
Garson
Georgetown
Georgian Heights
Georgian Highlands
Georgian Inlet
Georgian Sands Beach
Geraldton
German Mills
Gesto
Gilbertville
Gibraltar
Gibson
Gilchrist Bay
Gildale
Gilford
Gillies Hill
Gilmour
Glanmire
Glascott
Glasgow
Glastonbury
Glen
Glen Buell
Glenburn
Glenburnie
Glen Cross
Glenfield
Glen Huron
Glencairn
Glencoe
Glenelg Centre
Glen Major
Glen Nevis
Glen Oak
Glenora
Glenpayne
Glen Robertson
Glenshee
Glenview
Glenville
Glen Williams
Gloucester
Godfrey
Gogama
Golden Lake
Goldfield
Gooderham
Gordon
Gores Landing
Gormley
Gorrie
Goshen
Gotham
Goulais River
Gouldbourn
Government Road
Gowanstown
Gowganda
Grafton
Grand Bend
Grand Desert
Granger
Grant
Granthurst
Graphite
Grasmere
Grattan
Gravel Hill
Gray's Beach
Greely
Greenbush
Green's Corners
Green Lane
Greenfield
Greenock
Green River
Green Valley
Greenview
Greensborough
Greensville
Greenway
Greenwood, Durham Regional Municipality
Greenwood, Renfrew County
Grimsthorpe
Grimston
Gros Cap
Guerin
Gunter

H

Habermehl
Haddo
Hagar
Hagarty
Hagermans Corner's
Hagersville
Hagey
Hagles Corners
Haileybury
Haines Lake
Hainsville
Haldane Hill
Haldimand
Haley Station
Halfway
Halfway House Corners
Halfway Point
Hallebourg
Hallecks
Hallowell
Hall's Glen
Halls Mills
Halpenny
Halsteads Bay
Hammertown
Hammond
Hampden
Hampshire Mills
Hampton
Hanmer
Hannon
Happy Hollow
Happy Landing
Happy Valley, Greater Sudbury
Happy Valley, York Regional Municipality
Harburn
Harcourt
Hardwood Lake
Harkaway
Harlock
Harlowe
Harrington
Harrington West
Harriston
Harrow
Harrowsmith
Hartfell
Harwood
Hastings
Hatchley
Havelock
Hawkes
Hawkestone
Hawkesville
Hawkins Corner
Hawk Junction
Hay's Shore
Hazeldean
Hazzards Corners
Head Lake
Heathcote
Heckston
Heidelberg
Hemlock
Henderson
Henrys Corners
Hensall
Hempstock Mill
Hepworth
Hereward
Heritage Park
Heron Bay
Herron's Mills
Heyden
Hiam
Hidden Valley
Highland Grove
Hillcrest, Prince Edward County, Ontario
Hillcrest, Norfolk County, Ontario
Hillsburgh
Hillsdale
Hilly Grove
Hockley
Hodgson
Hogg
Holford
Holland
Holland Centre
Holland Landing
Holleford
Holly
Holly Park
Holmesville
Holstein
Honey Harbour
Honeywood
Hood
Hope
Hopetown
Hopeville
Hornby
Horning's Mills
Hotham
Hotspur
Howdenvale
Huckabones Corner
Hudon
Huffs Corners
Hughes
Hungry Hollow
Hurdville
Hurkett
Hutton
Hybla
Hydro Glen

I

Ice Lake
Ida
Ida Hill
Ignace
Ilderton
Ilfracombe
Indian River
Indiana
Ingle
Ingleside
Inglewood
Inglis Falls
Ingoldsby
Ingolf
Inholmes
Inkerman
Inkerman Station
Innerkip
Innisville
Inverary
Inverhuron
Invermay
Inverness Lodge
Iona
Iona Station
Ireland
Irish Lake
Iron Bridge
Irondale
Ironsides
Iroquois
Iroquois Falls
Island Grove
Islington
Ivanhoe
Iverhaugh
Ivy
Ivy Lea

J

Jackfish
Jack Lake, Peterborough County
Jack Lake, Simcoe County
Jackson
Jacksonburg
Jackson's Point
Jaffa
Jaffray Melick
Jamestown
Jamot
Janetville
Jarratt
Jarvis
Jasper
Jeannette
Jeannettes Creek
Jefferson
Jellicoe
Jellyby
Jericho
Jermyn
Jerseyville
Jessopville
Jessups Falls
Jevins
Jewellville
Jockvale
Joes Lake
Jogues
Johnsons Ferry
Johnston Corners
Johnstown, Hastings County
Johnstown, Leeds and Grenville United Counties
Jones
Jones Falls
Jordan
Jordan Harbour
Jordan Station
Josephburg
Joyceville
Joyland Beach
Joyvista Estates
Juddhaven
Judgeville
Junetown
Juniper Island
Jura

K

Kaboni
Kagawong
Kakabeka Falls
Kaladar
Kaministiquia
Kanata
Karalash Corners
Kars
Kashabowie
Kaszuby
Kathmae Siding
Katimavik
Katrine
Kawartha Hideway
Kawartha Park
Kawene
Keady
Kearns
Kedron
Keelerville, Frontenac County
Keenansville
Keene
Keewatin
Keldon
Keller Bridge
Kellys Corner
Kemble
Kemptville
Kenabeek
Kennaway
Kennedys
Kent Bridge
Kentvale
Kerwood
Keswick
Kettleby
Kettle Point 44
Keward
Keyser
Khartum
Kilgorie
Killaloe
Killbear Park
Kilsyth
Kilworthy
Kimball
Kimberley
Kinburn
Kincardine
Kinmount
King City
King Creek
Kinghorn
Kinghurst
Kingsbridge
Kingscote
Kingwood
Kinsale
Kintail
Kintore
Kiosk
Kirby
Kirk Cove
Kirkfield
Kirkhill
Kleinburg
Knight's Corners
Komoka
Kormak

L

L'Amable
L'Ange-Gardien
L'Orignal
La Passe
La Renouche
La Rue Mills
La Salette
Lac-Sainte-Thérèse
Lac La Croix
Lac Seul
Laclu
Lady Bank
Ladysmith
Lafontaine
Lafontaine Beach
Laggan
Lagoon City
Lake Bernard
Lake Charles
Lake Clear
Lake Dalrymple
Lake Dore
Lake Helen
Lake Huron Highland
Lake Joseph
Lake Morningstar
Lake On The Mountain
Lake Opinicon
Lake Rosalind
Lake St. Peter
Lake Traverse
Lake Valley Grove
Lakefield
Lakehurst
Lakelet
Lakeport
Lakeside, Kenora District, Ontario
Lakeside, Oxford County, Ontario
Lambeth, Middlesex County
Lambeth, Oxford County
Lamlash
Lammermoor
Lancaster
Lancelot
Landerkin
Langford
Langstaff
Langton
Lansdowne
Laskay
Laurel
Laurel Station
Lauriston
Lavant
Layton
Leaside
Leaskdale
Leeburn
Leeds
Lefaivre
Lefroy
Leggatt
Legge
Lehighs Corners
Leith
Leitrim
Lemieux
Letterbreen
Levack
Lewisham
Lighthouse Beach
Lillies
Lily Oak
Limehouse
Limoges
Linden Bank
Lindenwood
Lindsay
Links Mills
Linton
Linwood
Lion's Head
Lisle
Listowel
Little Britain
Little Current
Little Germany, Grey County
Little Germany, Northumberland County
Little Longlac
Little Rapids
Lively
Living Springs
Lloyd
Lloydtown
Lobo
Lochalsh, Algoma District
Lochalsh, Huron County
Lochwinnoch
Lockerby
Locksley
Lombardy
Londesborough
Long Bay
Long Beach, Kawartha Lakes
Long Beach, Niagara Regional Municipality
Long Lake, Frontenac County
Long Lake, Thunder Bay District
Longlac
Longford Mills
Long Point
Long Sault
Longwood
Lords Mills
Lorimer Lake
Lorne Park
Lorneville
Lorraine
Lorreto
Lost Channel, Hastings County
Lost Channel, Parry Sound District
Louise
Lowbanks
Low Bush River
Lower Stafford
Lowther
Lucan
Lucasville
Lucknow
Ludgate
Lueck Mill
Luton
Lyn
Lyndale
Lynden
Lyndhurst
Lynedoch
Lynhurst
Lynnville
Lyons

M

M'Chigeeng
Mabee's Corners
Macdiarmid
MacDonald Bay
MacDonald Grove
MacDuff
Macey Bay
MacGillivrays Bridge
Mackenzie
MacKenzie Point
Mackey
Mackey Siding
Macksville
MacLarens Landing
MacTier
Macton
Macville
Madawaska
Madigans
Madoc
Madsen
Magnetawan
Maguire
Maidstone
Maitland, Huron County
Maitland, United Counties of Leeds and Grenville
Malakoff
Malcolm
Mallorytown
Malone
Malton
Manbert
Manchester
Manhard
Manilla
Manions Corners
Manitou Dock
Manitouwadge
Manitowaning
Mannheim
Manotick
Mansewood
Mansfield, Dufferin County
Manvers Township
Maple
Maple Beach
Maple Grove
Maple Hill, Bruce County
Maple Hill, Frontenac County
Maple Hill, York Regional Municipality
Maple Island
Maple Lane
Maple Leaf
Maple Valley, Clearview
Maple Valley, Severn
Maplewood
Marble Bluff
Marden
Marlbank
Mariposa
Mariposa Beach
Markdale
Markstay
Marmion
Marmora
Marmora Station
Marsh Hill
Marsville
Marten River
Martins
Martins Corner
Martintown
Marionville
Maryhill
Marysville, Frontenac County, Ontario
Marysville, Hastings County, Ontario
Massanoga
Massey
Massie
Matachewan
Mathers Corners
Mattagami First Nation
Mattice
Maxville
Maxwell, Grey County
Maxwell, Hastings County
Maxwells
Mayfield West
Mayhew
Mayhews Landing
Maynard
Maynooth
Maynooth Station
McAlpine Corners
McCann's Shore
McCarleys Corners
McConkey
McCormick
McCrackens Landing
McCrae
McCreary's Shore
McCrimmon
McCulloughs Landing
McDougall
McGarry Flats
McGinnis Creek
McGrath
McGregor
McGuires Settlement
McIntosh, Bruce County
McIntosh, Kenora District
McIntyre, Grey County
McIntyre, Lennox and Addington County
McIvor
McKerrow
McKillop
McLean
McLeansville
McMillans Corners
McNaughton Shore
McRoberts Corner
Meadowvale
Medina
Melbourne
Meldrum Bay
Melissa
Menie
Merlin
Merrickville
Metcalfe
Meyersburg
Michipicoten
Micksburg
Middleport
Middleville
Midhurst
Mildmay
Milford
Milford Bay
Millbank
Miller Lake
Millhaven
Milliken
Milnet
Milverton
Minaki
Mindemoya
Minden
Mine Centre
Minesing
Minett
Mishkeegogamang First Nation
Missanabie
Mississippi Station
Mitchell
Mitchell's Bay
Mitchell's Corners
Mitchellville
Moffat
Moira
Monck
Monetville
Monkland
Monkton
Mono Mills
Monteagle
Monteith
Monticello
Monument Corner
Moonstone
Moorefield
Mooresburg
Moores Lake
Mooretown
Moose Creek
Moose Factory
Moosonee
Moray
Morganston
Morrisburg
Morson
Morrison Landing
Mortimer's Point
Morven
Mosborough
Moscow
Mossley
Mountain
Mountain Grove
Mountain View Beach
Mount Albert
Mount Brydges
Mount Carmel, Prince Edward County, Ontario
Mount Carmel, Essex County, Ontario
Mount Carmel, Haldimand County, Ontario
Mount Carmel, Middlesex County, Ontario
Mount Elgin
Mount Forest
Mount Hope, Bruce County
Mount Hope, Hamilton
Mount Joy
Mount Julian
Mount Pleasant, Brampton
Mount Pleasant, Brant County
Mount Pleasant, Grey County
Mount Pleasant, Hastings County
Mount Pleasant, Lennox and Addington County
Mount Pleasant, Perth County
Mount Pleasant, Peterborough County
Mount Pleasant, York Regional Municipality
Mount Salem
Mount St. Patrick
Muncey
Mullifarry
Mulock, in the municipality of West Grey, Grey County
Mulock, in Nipissing District
Muncey
Munster
Murchison
Murillo
Musclow
Muskoka
Muskoka Lodge
Muskrat Dam
Musselman Lake
Myers Cave
Myrtle
Myrtle Station

N

Nairn, Middlesex County
Nairn Centre
Naiscoot
Nakina
Nanticoke
Nantyr
Nantyr Park
Napanee
Naphan
Napier
Napperton
Nares Inlet
Narrows
Narva
Nashville
Nation Valley
Naughton
Navan
Nayausheeng
Nelles Corners
Nellie Lake
Nemegos
Nenagh
Nepean
Nephton
Neskantaga First Nation
Nestleton
Nestleton Station
Nestorville
Nestor Falls
Netherby
Neustadt
Newbliss
Newboro
Newburgh
New Canaan
New Carlow
New Credit
New Dublin
New Dundee
New Glasgow
New Hamburg
New Liskeard
New Lowell
New Prussia
New Sarum
New Scotland, Chatham-Kent
New Scotland, Regional Municipality of York
New Wexford
Newburgh
Newcastle
Newholm
Newington
Newtonville
Nibinamik First Nation
Nicholsons Point
Niisaachewan Anishinaabe Nation
Nile
Nipigon
Niweme
Nixon
Nobel
Nobleton
Noëlville
Norham
Norland
Norman
Normandale
North Augusta
Northbrook
Northcote
North Gower
North Grenville
North Hall
North Lancaster
North Monaghan
North Monetville
North Perry
Northport
North Seguin
Northville
Norval
Norvern Shores
Norwood
Nosbonsing
Notre-Dame-des-Champs
Nottawa
Novar

O

O'Briens Landing
O'Connell
O'Donnell Landing
O'Grady Settlement
O'Reilly's Bridge
Oak Flats
Oak Heights
Oak Lake
Oak Lake, Peterborough County
Oak Leaf
Oak Ridges
Oak Shores Estates
Oak Valley
Oakdale
Oakdene Point
Oakgrove
Oakhill Forest
Oakland, Brant County
Oakland, Essex County
Oaklawn Beach
Oakwood
Oba
Oconto
Odenback
Odessa
Off Lake Corner
Ogden's Beach
Ogoki
Ohsweken
Oil City
Ojibway Island
Ojibways of Hiawatha First Nation
Old Cut
Old Fort
Old Killaloe
Old Spring Bay
Old Stittsville
Old Woman's River
Oldcastle
Oldfield
Olinda
Oliphant
Oliver, Essex County
Oliver, Middlesex County
Olivet
Omagh
Omemee
Ompah
Onaping
Onaping Falls
Onondaga
Onyotaa:ka First Nation
Opasatika
Opeongo
Ophir
Orange Corners
Oranmore
Orchard Point
Orchardville
Orleans
Ormsby
Oro Station
Oro–Medonte
Orono
Orrville
Orton
Osaca
Osborne
Osceola
Osgoode
Oso
Osprey
Otonabee-South Monaghan
Otter Creek, Bruce County, Ontario
Otter Creek, Hastings County
Otterville
Ouellette
Oustic
Outlet
Oxenden
Oxford Mills

P

Paget
Pagwa River
Paincourt
Painswick
Paisley
Pakenham
Pakesley
Palermo
Palgrave
Palm Beach
Palmer Rapids
Palmerston
Paradise Lake
Parham
Paris
Parkdale
Parkersville
Parkhill
Park Head
Pass Lake
Paudash
Payne
Peabody
Pearceley
Pearl
Pearl Lake
Peawanuck
Pefferlaw
Pendleton
Pentland Corners
Perivale
Perkinsfield
Perm
Perrins Corners
Perth Road Village
Pethericks Corners
Pevensey
Phelpston
Piccadilly
Pickerel Lake
Pickle Crow
Picton
Pikwakanagan First Nation
Pinedale
Pine Grove
Pine Valley
Pinewood
Piperville
Plainville
Plantagenet
Pleasant Corners
Pleasant Valley, Manitoulin District, Ontario
Pleasant Valley, Stormont, Dundas and Glengarry Counties, Ontario
Pleasant Valley, Essex County, Ontario
Pleasant Valley, Hamilton, Ontario
Pleasant Valley, Renfrew County, Ontario
Pleasant View
Plevna
Plummer Additional
Point Abino
Pointe Fortune
Pointe au Baril
Poland
Pomona
Ponsonby
Pontypool
Pooles Resort
Poplar
Poplar Dale
Porcupine
Port Albert
Port Anson
Port Bolster
Port Britain
Port Bruce
Port Burwell
Port Carling
Port Carmen
Port Credit
Port Cunnington
Port Davidson
Port Dover
Port Elgin
Port Elmsley
Porter's Hill
Port Granby
Port Law
Port McNicoll
Port Perry
Port Rowan
Port Ryerse
Port Severn
Port Stanley
Port Sydney
Portland
Pottageville
Potters Landing
Powassan
Powells Corners
Precious Corners
Preneveau
Preston
Prestonvale
Priceville
Primrose
Princeton
Prospect
Proton Station
Providence Bay
Punkeydoodles Corners
Purdy
Purple Hill
Purple Valley
Purpleville
Pusey

Q

Quabbin
Quadeville
Quantztown
Quarindale
Queens Line
Queensborough
Queensgate
Queenston
Queensville
Queenswood Heights
Quibell
Quinn
Quinn Settlement

R

Radiant
Ragged Rapids
Raglan, Chatham-Kent
Raglan, Durham Regional Municipality
Railton
Rainham Centre
Raith
Rama
Ramore
Ramsayville
Ramsey
Randall
Randwick
Ranelagh
Ranger Lake
Rankin, Nipissing District
Rankin, Renfrew County
Rannoch
Rathburn
Ratho
Rattlesnake Harbour
Ratzburg
Ravenna
Ravenscliffe
Ravenshoe
Ravensview
Ravenswood
Ravensworth
Raymond
Raymonds Corners
Rayside
Rayside-Balfour
Reaboro
Read
Reading
Redan
Red Bay
Red Cap Beach
Redickville
Redwood
Relessey
Renfrew Junction
Renton
Restoule
Rhineland
Richard's Landing
Richardson
Richmond
Rideau Ferry
Ridgetown
Ridgeville
Ridgeway
Rimington
Ripley
Ritchance
Riverview
Riverview Heights
Riviera Estate
Rivière-Veuve
Robbtown
Robertson's Shore
Robin Landing
Roches Point
Rockcut
Rockdale
Rockfield
Rockford
Rockingham
Rockland
Rock Mills
Rockport
Rocksprings
Rockwood
Rocky Saugeen
Rodney
Roebuck
Rolphton
Ronaldson
Rosebank
Rosedale
Rose Hill
Rosemont
Roseneath
Rosetta
Roslin
Rossclair
Rossport
Rothwell's Shore
Rush Point
Ruskview
Rutherford
Rutherglen
Ruthven
Rutter
Rydal Bank

S

Sable
Sabourins Crossing
Saganaga Lake
Saginaw
Sahanatien
Saintfield
Salem in Arran–Elderslie, Bruce County
Salem in South Bruce, Bruce County
Salem, Dufferin County
Salem, Durham Regional Municipality
Salem, Frontenac County
Salem, Northumberland County
Salem, Wellington County
Salford
Salisbury
Salmon Point
Salmonville
Saltford
Sam Lake
Sandford
Sand Banks
Sand Bay Corner
Sandcastle Beach
Sandfield
Sandringham
Sandy Hill
Sandy Lake
Sans Souci
Sarepta
Sauble Beach
Sauble Beach North
Sauble Beach South
Sauble Falls
Saugeen
Savanne
Savant Lake
Schipaville
Scone
Scotch Block
Scotch Bush, Hastings County, Ontario
Scotch Bush, Renfrew County, Ontario
Scotch Corners
Scotia
Scotland
Scugog
Scugog Centre
Schomberg
Sebright
Seagrave
Seaforth
Seeley
Seeleys Bay
Seguin
Selby
Selkirk
Selton
Senecal
Seouls Corner
Sesekinika
Seven Mile Narrows
Severn Bridge
Severn Falls
Shady Nook
Shakespeare
Shallow Lake
Shamrock
Shannon Hall
Shannonville
Shanty Bay
Sharbot Lake
Sharon
Shebandowan
Shebeshekong
Shedden
Sheffield
Sherwood
Sherwood Springs
Shetland
Shillington
Shiloh
Shouldice
Shrigley
Siberia
Silver Creek
Silver Dollar
Silver Hill
Simpson Corners
Singhampton
Sioux Narrows
Skerryvore
Skipness
Slate Falls
Sleeman
Smithdale
Smithville
Snelgrove
Snowball
Snow Road Station
Snug Harbour
Snug Haven
Sodom
Sonya
Soperton
South Augusta
South Beach
South Branch
Southcott Pines
South Crosby
South Dummer
South March
South Middleton
South Monaghan
South Wilberforce
Southampton
Sowerby
Sparkle City
Sparta
Speedside
Spence
Speyside
Spicer
Spier
Spring Bay
Springbrook
Springfield
Springford
Springhill
Springmount
Springvale
Spring Valley
Springville
Squire
Squirrel Town
St. Agatha
St. Albert
St. Andrews
St. Anns
St. Augustine
St. Bernardin
St. Clair Beach
St. Clements
St. Cloud
St. Columban
St. David's, Niagara Regional Municipality
St. Davids, Prescott and Russell United Counties
St. Elmo, Muskoka District Municipality
St. Elmo, Stormont, Dundas and Glengarry United Counties
St. Eugene
St. Felix
St. George
St. Helens
St. Isidore
St. Jacobs
St. Joachim
St. Johns, Brant County
St. Johns, Niagara Regional Municipality
St. Joseph, Huron County
St. Joseph Island
St. Ola
St. Williams
St. Pascal Baylon
St. Pauls
St. Pauls Station
St. Raphaels
St. Williams
Stamford
Stanleydale
Stanton
Stayner
Ste-Anne-de-Prescott
Stella
Ste-Rose-de-Prescott
Stevensville
Stewarttown
Stinson
Stirling
Stirling Falls
Stittsville
Stonebrook
Stonecliffe
Stonehart
Stones Corners
Stoney Creek
Stoney Point
Stories
Storms Corners
Stouffville
Strange
Strathavon
Strathmore
Strathroy
Streetsville
Stroud
Sturgeon Falls
Sturgeon Point
Sulphide
Summerhill
Summers Corners
Sunderland
Sunfish Lake
Sunnidale, Lambton County, Ontario
Sunnidale, Simcoe County, Ontario
Sunnidale Corners, Ontario
Sunnidale Corners
Sunny Slope
Sunrise Beach
Sunset Bay Estates
Sunset Beach, several
Sunset Corners
Sutton
Swan Crossing
Swansea
Swastika
Sweets Corners, Haldimand County, Ontario
Sweets Corners, Leeds and Grenville United Counties, Ontario
Swindon
Swinton Park
Switzerville
Sydenham, Frontenac County
Sydenham, Grey County
Sylvan Valley

T

Taits Beach
Talbot
Talbotville Royal
Tamarack
Tamworth
Tanglewood Beach
Tannery
Tansley
Tansleyville
Tapley
Tapleytown
Tara
Tarbert
Tartan
Tarzwell
Tatlock
Taunton
Tavistock
Taylor
Taylorwoods
Tayside
Teeswater
Teeterville
Temperanceville
Terra Cotta
Terra Nova
Thamesford
Thamesville
The Gully
The Slash
Thedford
Tennyson
Teston
Thistle
Thompson Hill
Thorah Beach
Thornbury
Thorndale
Thornhill
Thorpe
Throoptown
Tichborne
Tilbury
Tilley
Tincap
Tintern
Tiverton
Toanche
Tobacco Lake
Tobermory
Toledo
Tolmie
Tomelin Bluffs
Topcliff
Tormore
Torrance
Tory Hill
Tottenham
Townsend
Tralee
Tramore
Traverston
Treadwell
Trenton
Trent River
Trevelyan
Tullamore
Turbine
Turkey Point
Turner
Turtle Lake
Tyrone

U

Udney
Udora
Uffington
Ufford
Uhthoff
Ullswater
Umfreville
Underwood
Uneeda
Ungers Corners
Union, Elgin County
Union, Essex County
Union, Leeds and Grenville United Counties
Union Creek
Union Hall
Uniondale
Unionville
Uphill
Uplands
Upper
Upper Paudash
Upsala
Uptergrove
Ursa
Utica
Utopia
Utterson
Uttoxeter

V

Val Caron
Val Côté
Val Gagné
Val Harbour
Val Rita
Val Thérèse
Valens
Valentia
Vallentyne
Van Allens
Vandeleur
Vanessa
Vanier
Vankleek Hill
Vansickle
Varney
Vanzant's Point
Vellore
Vennachar
Ventry
Verner
Verona
Vermilion Bay
Vernon Shores
Vernonville
Verulam Township
Vesta
Vickers
Victoria Square
Village Lanthier
Vinegar Hill
Vineland
Violet
Violet Hill
Virginiatown
Vittoria
Vroomanton

W

Waba
Wabigoon
Wabos
Wabozominissing
Waddington Beach
Wade's Landing
Wagarville
Wagram
Wahawin
Wahnapitae
Wahnapitae First Nation
Wahta Mohawk Territory
Wahwashkesh Lake
Waldau
Waldemar
Walden
Walford
Walker Woods
Walkers
Walkers Point
Walkerton
Walkerville
Wallace, Nipissing District
Wallace, Perth County
Wallaceburg
Wallace Point
Wallbridge
Wallenstein
Walls
Walnut
Walpole Island
Walsh
Walsingham
Walters Falls
Walton
Waneeta Beach
Wanikewin
Wanstead
Wanup
Warburton
Ward
Wardsville
Wareham
Warina
Warings Corner
Warkworth
Warminster
Warner
Warren
Warsaw
Wartburg
Washagami
Washago
Washburn
Washburn Island
Washburns Corners
Washington
Wasing
Watercombe
Waterdown
Waterfall
Waterford
Waterton
Watford
Watsons
Watsons Corners
Wattenwyle
Waterson Corners
Waubamik
Waubaushene
Waubuno
Waudby
Waupoos
Waupoos East
Waupoos Island
Wavecrest
Wavell
Waverley
Waverley Beach
Wayside
Webbwood
Webequie First Nation
Welbeck
Welcome
Wellesley
Wendake Beach
Wendover
Werner Lake
Weslemkoon
Wesley
West Corners
West Essa
West Guilford
West Huntingdon
West Huntingdon Station
West Lake
West Lorne
Westmeath
Westminster, Middlesex County
Westminster, Prescott and Russell United Counties
West McGillivray
West Montrose
Westview
Westwood
Wharncliffe
Wheatley
Whitfield
Whitney
Whittington
Wiarton
Wick
Wicklow
Wilberforce
Wilcox Corners
Wildwood
Wilfrid
Wilkinson
Williamsburg
Williamsford
Williamsport
Williamstown
Williscroft
Willowbank
Wilmot Creek
Wilsonville
Wilstead
Wilton
Winchester
Windermere
Windham Centre
Wingham
Winisk
Winona
Winslow
Wisawasa
Wodehouse
Woito
Wolftown
Wolseley
Woodbridge
Woodington
Woodrous
Woods
Woods Bay
Woodslee
Woodville
Woodward Station
Wooler
Wrightmans Corners
Wroxeter
Wyebridge
Wyecombe
Wyevale
Wyoming

Y

Yarker
Yarmouth Centre
Yatton
Yearley
Yellek
Yelverton
Yeovil
Yerexville
Yonge Mills
York, Haldimand County
Young's Cove
Young's Point
Youngstown
Youngsville
Yule

Z

Zadow
Zealand
Zenda
Zephyr
Zimmerman
Zion, Ashfield-Colborne-Wawanosh, Huron County
Zion, Grey County
Zion, Kawartha Lakes
Zion, Northumberland County
Zion, Peterborough County
Zion, South Huron, Huron County
Zion Line
Ziska
Zorra Station
Zuber Corners
Zurich

See also

List of cities in Ontario
List of municipalities in Ontario
List of towns in Ontario
List of township municipalities in Ontario
List of villages in Ontario

Unincorporated communities